Quality Capital Management Ltd (often abbreviated as QCM) is a UK-based hedge fund specialising in managed futures. The company was founded by Aref Karim in 1995 and its headquarters is in Weybridge, Elmbridge, Surrey, England.

History
Quality Capital Management (QCM) is a UK limited liability company incorporated in December 1995 with its head office in Weybridge, Elmbridge, Surrey. It is a systematic macro hedge fund manager specialising in managed futures.

QCM is regulated in the UK by the Financial Conduct Authority and is registered in the U.S with the Commodity Futures Trading Commission/National Futures Association as a commodity trading advisor and a commodity pool operator. It has an office in Tokyo and is registered with the Japanese Financial Services Agency. The company was founded by Aref Karim who is its chief executive officer and Chief Investment Officer and also carries overall responsibility for its investment strategies and research.

In June 2011, an office in Tokyo was opened, which is being run by Osamu Nishimura, an ex-Itochu executive, who is a veteran in derivatives trading, hedge fund investment and funds marketing.

Investment products
QCM investor base is global and largely institutional, sovereigns and pensions.

It currently offers four products. It offers three 'long volatility' investment programmes: the Global Diversified Programme, the Global Natural Resources Programme and the Enhanced Commodity Beta Programme, with a total assets under management of $670 million as of February 2009. Each fund is offshore and each offers managed accounts for larger investments. Global Diversified is also available in a UCITS wrapper through the db Platinum platform.

In December 1995, QCM's flagship Global Diversified Programme (GDP), commenced trading through managed accounts and established a BVI-domiciled offshore fund, QCM GDP Otus Fund, in June 1999, followed by a U.S feeder fund in February 2009. It established the DB Platinum IV QCM GDP Index Fund as the sub-fund of a Luxembourg-domiciled Ucits-compliant SICAV on 11 May 2011.

Performance
QCM's Global Diversified Programme (GDP) trades 116 exchange-traded Financial and Commodities futures in major exchanges worldwide. It relies on a market environment of price persistence to properly function.

In 2006, the models were reported to have worked particularly well: GDP, which trades 80 global futures markets, returned 35.11%; the global natural resources program, which trades 36 physical commodity markets, returned 35.74% and the enhanced commodity beta program, which trades the same 36 commodity markets from a long-only perspective, returned 50.24%. In 2008, the hedge fund made £42.9m profit on £49.3m sales, returning 59%. Karim and his family own at least 97% of the £150m operation. Past dividends and other assets take them to £150m. The company has assets in the region of £150 million according to the Sunday Times Rich List. The GDP made a near 60% return in 2008, but struggled in 2009, losing 12%. Between 2005 and 2010, it has achieved annualised returns of around 20%.

QCM manages assets of $900m. As of 10 June 2011, the GDP had a total of $611m in assets, including $524m in managed accounts, $72m in the offshore fund and $6m in the Ucits fund. Between 1995 and 2011, QCM returned more than 600% growth to its investors, with only two negative years. The GDP produced annualised returns of 15% over the 14 years from inception and 21% for the five years to April 2010.

Strategies
QCM trades in financial and commodities assets in 115 instruments worldwide. It invests its funds through proprietary strategies that take futures positions in major global exchanges across financial and commodity markets.

QCM uses an allocation model that looks for short-term changes in acceleration. It relies on market diversification, trading a large portfolio of different asset classes, uses few trend-based indicators and its investment process is driven by dynamic asset allocation through the proprietary Advanced Resource Allocator (ARA) model, a proprietary trading system which attempts to try and shift risk away from positions not working in QCM's favour with an algorithm that adjusts position sizes focusing on upside volatility. A risk budget is deployed based on relative opportunities through mainly an asset allocation process.

Sponsorship
In 2015, QCM signed a three-year sponsorship deal with Asian Tour golfer.

See also
Business of British Bangladeshis

References

External links

Financial services companies established in 1995
1995 establishments in England
Hedge fund firms in the United Kingdom
Investment management companies of the United Kingdom
Privately held companies of England
Companies based in Surrey
Weybridge, Surrey